In Greek mythology, Neda (Ancient Greek: Νέδαν or Νέδα) was a Messenian or Arcadian nymph and one of the nurses of the child Zeus.

The river Neda and a town in Arcadia named after her.

Mythology 
In the Messenian account, Neda, together with another nymph Ithome, brought up and bathed the infant Zeus after he was stolen by the Curetes owing to the danger that threatened from his father. These nymphs gave their name to the river Neda and mountain Ithome.

Meanwhile, the Arcadian version claimed that Neda, Anthracia, Hagno, Anchirhoe and Myrtoessa were the nurturers of the king of the gods. Neda was depicted to carry the infant god.

She was represented at Athens in the temple of Athena.

References 

 Pausanias, Description of Greece with an English Translation by W.H.S. Jones, Litt.D., and H.A. Ormerod, M.A., in 4 Volumes. Cambridge, MA, Harvard University Press; London, William Heinemann Ltd. 1918. . Online version at the Perseus Digital Library
 Pausanias, Graeciae Descriptio. 3 vols. Leipzig, Teubner. 1903. Greek text available at the Perseus Digital Library.

Nymphs
Arcadian mythology
Messenian mythology